The 1929–30 season was the 35th season of competitive football by Southampton, and the club's eighth in the Second Division of the Football League. After finishing fourth in the Second Division the previous season – their highest position in the league to date – Southampton continued their efforts towards achieving promotion to the First Division, but finished three places lower in seventh. The club struggled at the beginning of the league campaign, remaining in the bottom half of the table due to a run of poor results. A period of form including six wins in eight games followed between September and November, enabling the Saints to move up as high as third place. The team remained in the top half of the Second Division table for most of the rest of the season, finishing in seventh place with 17 wins, 11 draws and 14 losses.

In the 1929–30 FA Cup, Southampton entered in the third round away to divisional rivals Bradford City, losing 4–1 to face elimination at the first hurdle for the third consecutive season (their worst run in the season since being knocked out of the first round in 1912, 1913 and 1914). The club ended their season as usual with two fixtures against local rivals Portsmouth, for the Hampshire Benevolent Cup and the Rowland Hospital Cup. The former (played at Fratton Park) ended in a goalless draw, while the latter (played at The Dell) ended in a 2–0 win for the travelling Pompey side. The Saints also played five friendly matches during the 1929–30 season, drawing with Aldershot Town in September, beating Corinthian in February, and drawing with a Salisbury District XI, beating Andover and losing to a Royal Air Force side in April.

Southampton used 28 different players during the 1929–30 season and had thirteen different goalscorers. Their top scorer was centre-forward Dick Rowley, who scored 25 goals in 25 appearances in the Second Division, and the club's only goal in the FA Cup. Willie Haines, the club's top scorer the previous season, ranked second with 15 goals in the league, followed by Johnny Arnold on seven league goals. Nine players were signed by the club during the campaign, with eight released and sold to other clubs. The average attendance at The Dell during the 1929–30 season was 12,786. The highest attendance was 25,934 against Tottenham Hotspur on Boxing Day 1929, which surpassed the last season's new league record of 24,247. The lowest attendance of the season was 4,881 against Millwall on 3 March 1930.

Background and transfers
Several players left Southampton at the end of the 1928–29 season. In May, inside-forward Tommy Taylor joined Welsh side Rhyl Athletic, while centre-forward Douglas Vernon – signed as an emergency replacement for Willie Haines in February – was recalled by the Royal Air Force. In June, the club sold outside-left Billy Murphy to fellow Second Division club Oldham Athletic, with fellow winger Reg Watson moving the other way as part of the deal. Also in June, the Saints signed inside-forward Bill Fraser from Aldershot Town in an "unusually complicated deal" including an initial payment of £60, another £200 from a friendly match between the two sides, £50 if he made 20 appearances for the first team during the season (which he did not), and a 5% share of any future transfer fee. The following month, inside-left Charlie Petrie and Scottish centre-forward Archie Waterston both moved to the Third Division North – the former joined York City, while the latter joined Tranmere Rovers. In August, Southampton brought in two more players – inside-right Oswald Littler joined from Rochdale (after a Football Association suspension for the player was lifted upon appeal by the club), and full-back Arthur Roberts signed from Ardsley Athletic.

Transfer activity continued during the course of the season. In September 1929, the Saints Supporters Club raised £400 to sign Scottish inside-left Peter Dougall (as well as teammate William Hood) from Clyde, with an additional £50 to be paid should either player make six appearances for the club. In October, recent amateur signing Ernie Warren left the club to sign another amateur deal with Southwick, although by March 1930 he had returned to sign for the Saints as a professional. The most significant transfer of the season came in February, when the campaign's top scorer Dick Rowley was sold to Tottenham Hotspur for a fee of £3,750, the club's second highest transfer fee to date after the £3,860 received for Bill Rawlings two years earlier. In March the club signed forward Thomas Groves from Blakenall and Scottish half-back Alex Sharp from Ayr United, with Warren also returning on professional terms. Just before the end of the season, Oswald Littler left Southampton to join Southern League side Guildford City.

Players transferred in

Players transferred out

Second Division

Southampton began the 1929–30 Second Division campaign against Barnsley, who had finished the previous season just four points above relegation. During the game, Jerry Mackie became the first Southampton player to be sent off since James Moore in December 1920, as the Saints lost 3–1 and started off in the bottom half of the Second Division league table. A 2–2 draw with Hull City was followed by home wins over Blackpool and West Bromwich Albion, which helped the Saints move up to seventh in the league. Dick Rowley quickly established himself as the season's top scorer with consecutive hat-tricks against Chelsea and Nottingham Forest in late September, the latter of which was a 5–0 away win, and later became the first Southampton player to score four goals in an away match when they beat Bradford City 5–2 on 2 November. A week later the club reached third in the Second Division table, their highest position of the season, after having picked up six wins in eight fixtures.

The 5–2 win over Bradford City was Southampton's last away win of the season until April, with their poor form on the road holding back their hopes of promotion to the top flight. Three losses and two draws saw the club drop to tenth in the table by mid-December, although by the end of the year they had returned to the top four following three more wins. The home win over Tottenham Hotspur on 26 December was a new league record attendance at The Dell of 25,934. After Rowley was sold to Spurs in February, the club struggled to continue scoring and ultimately dropped too many points to remain in the fight for promotion. In March the club won just one game, a 2–1 home win over Bradford City, although managed to remain in the top seven of the league. Three wins out of six in April helped them move up to sixth, although a pair of thrashings at the hands of Charlton Athletic and West Bromwich Albion saw them drop back to seventh, where they finished with 17 wins, 11 draws and 14 losses.

List of match results

Final league table

Results by matchday

FA Cup

Southampton entered the 1929–30 FA Cup in the third round against Second Division rivals Bradford City, who they had recently beaten 5–2 in the league. The Saints were described by club historians as being in poor form defensively, with "an awful defensive mix-up" leading to an opening goal for the hosts. Dick Rowley equalised later, but Bradford were able to score three more goals and advance. Southampton's elimination marked the third consecutive season in which they had failed to win a game in the FA Cup – their worst run since the three seasons between 1911–12 and 1913–14.

Other matches
Outside of the league and the FA Cup, Southampton played seven additional first-team matches during the 1929–30 season. The first was a friendly match against Southern League side Aldershot Town on 25 September, which ended in a 3–3 draw. Goals for the Saints were scored by Dick Rowley (two) and Johnny Arnold. The club hosted amateur side Corinthian in February, winning 2–0 thanks to a brace from Willie Haines. Three more friendlies followed in April. The first, against a Salisbury District XI, ended in a 2–2 draw with Bill Fraser and Jerry Mackie scoring for Southampton; the second was a 6–1 thrashing of Hampshire League side Andover, with goals scored by Haines (three), Fraser (two) and Arnold; and the third was a 1–0 loss at a Royal Air Force team.

The club ended the season with two games against local rivals Portsmouth, in the annual Hampshire Benevolent Cup and Rowland Hospital Cup fixtures. The former game took place at Fratton Park on 5 May and ended goalless, with both sides dominating a half each according to the Southern Daily Echo. Two days later, Southampton hosted Pompey in the Rowland Hospital Cup. The First Division visitors won the match 2–0 thanks to a pair of goals from centre-forward Methuen, although the Evening News admitted that Portsmouth were "somewhat lucky to win".

Player details
Southampton used 28 different players during the 1929–30 season, 13 of whom scored during the campaign. The team played in a 2–3–5 formation throughout, using two full-backs, three half-backs, two outside forwards, two inside forwards and a centre-forward. Goalkeeper Willie White made the most appearances for the club during the campaign, missing only two league games and the FA Cup fixture. Left-back Michael Keeping played in all but three league games and both end-of-season games. Centre-forward Dick Rowley finished as the season's top scorer with 25 goals in the Second Division and one in the cup, despite leaving the club four three months before the end of the season. Willie Haines, who took Rowley's place in the side after his departure, scored 15 goals in the league, while Johnny Arnold scored seven.

Squad statistics

Most appearances

Top goalscorers

Footnotes

References

Bibliography

External links
Southampton F.C. official website

Southampton F.C. seasons
Southampton